Jenis Kristian av Rana (born 7 January 1953 in Trongisvágur) is a Faroese medical practitioner and politician, serving as leader of the Centre Party since 2001. He served as minister of Foreign Affairs and Culture of the Faroe Islands from 2019 until his party's withdrawal from government in November 2022. 

Jenis av Rana has been elected to the Løgting (the Faroese parliament) since 1994 and has been parliamentary leader for his party since then. His strong social conservative beliefs, particularly towards LGBT rights, have made him a controversial figure in Faroese politics, especially when he refused a dinner invitation from the then-Icelandic prime minister Jóhanna Sigurðardóttir due to her sexuality.

Early life and career 
Jenis av Rana is the son of Aslaug and Dánjal av Rana, former mayor of  Tvøroyri. He is married and has three children. After finishing high school, he worked as a teacher in Tvøroyri and Froðba 1972–1974. He studied in Aarhus University and graduated in medicine in 1983. Jenis av Rana has been working as a medical practitioner in Tórshavn since 1995. He is a preacher and radio host and board member of the Christian radio station Lindin, which started to broadcast on 21 January 2001.

On 16 September 2019 he was appointed as minister of foreign affairs and culture of the Faroe Islands in the government of Bárður á Steig Nielsen.

On 8 November 2022 he was dismissed from his position as minister of foreign affairs and culture after stating that he could not support Conservative People's Party leader Søren Pape Poulsen, who is openly gay, as Prime Minister of Denmark due to his sexuality. Av Rana subsequently pulled Centre's support of á Steig Nielsen's government, triggering a snap election.

References 

1953 births
Living people
People from Trongisvágur
Members of the Løgting
Centre Party (Faroe Islands) politicians
21st-century Danish politicians
Foreign Ministers of the Faroe Islands